Mumbai Pune Mumbai 3 (also known as Mumbai Pune Mumbai 3 Sukh Mhanje Nakki Kaay Asta!) is Indian Marathi language romantic drama film produced by 52 Friday Cinemas and Everest Entertainment and distributed by Eros International.

It is the sequel to 2015's Marathi film Mumbai-Pune-Mumbai 2. Directed and written by Satish Rajwade, the film stars Swapnil Joshi, Mukta Barve in lead roles and Prashant Damle, Mangal Kenkre, Vijay Kenkre, Savita Prabhune, Suhas Joshi in supporting roles. The screenplay and the dialogues are written by Ashwini Shende, Pallavi Rajwade and Satish Rajwade. The film score and soundtrack album are composed by Avinash-Vishwajeet and Nilesh Moharir.

The film was theatrically released on 7 December 2018.

Cast 

 Swapnil Joshi as Gautam Pradhan
 Mukta Barve as Gauri Pradhan
 Prashant Damle as Shekhar Pradhan (Gautam's father)
 Mangala Kenkre as Sunita Pradhan (Gautam's mother)
 Vijay Kenkre as Ashok Deshpande (Gauri's father)
 Savita Prabhune as Sunanda Deshpande (Gauri's mother) 
 Suhas Joshi as Suhas Pradhan (Gautam's grandmother)
 Rupal Nand as Rashmi Deshpande (Gauri's sister) 
 Rohini Hattangadi as Shubhu Mavshi (Gauri's gynecologist)

Soundtrack

Avinash and Vishwajeet are the music directors for the film. The songs featured in the film are composed by Nilesh Moharir, Avinash-Vishwajeet and lyrics are written by Devyani Karve-Kothari, Pallavi Rajwade and Vishwajeet Joshi.

Everest Entertainment released the music video of the song "Kuni Yenar Ga" on 12 November 2018 on YouTube. The song is sung by Hrishikesh Ranade, Aanandi Joshi, Saee Tembhekar, Jaydeep Bagwadkar, Varsha Bhave, Yogita Godbole and Mandar Apte. It is composed by Nilesh Moharir and lyrics are penned by Devayani Karve Kothari and Pallavi Rajwade. The second song of the film, "Aali Thumkat Naar" from the 1972 film Pinjara originally sung by Vishnu Waghmare and composed by Ram Kadam has been recreated for this film by Avinash-Vishwajeet in the voices of Aadarsh Shinde and it was released on 3 December 2018.

The third song "Tula Pahata" was released on 6 December 2018. The song is sung by Hrishikesh Ranade, composed by Avinash-Vishwajeet and lyrics are penned by Vishwajeet Joshi and Jay Atre.

Track listing

Production

Development
Director Satish Rajwade had announced Mumbai Pune Mumbai 3 during the promotion of Mumbai-Pune-Mumbai 2. In the film Mukta Barve and Swapnil Joshi will be playing lead roles and Prashant Damle, Mangal Kenkre, Vijay Kenkre, Savita Prabhune and Suhas Joshi forms the supporting cast.

Release

Marketing
The first look of the film's official motion logo released on 2 August 2018 on YouTube. The films official small teaser released on YouTube on 4 October 2018. Everest Entertainment released the official trailer of the film on 26 November 2018.

Box Office
Mumbai Pune Mumbai 3 opened on a very positive note at the box office especially in metro cities.

References

External links

2018 films
Indian sequel films
Indian romantic comedy-drama films
2010s Marathi-language films
Indian pregnancy films
Films directed by Satish Rajwade
2018 romantic comedy-drama films